Begi refers to several places in Ethiopia:

Begi, Benishangul-Gumuz (woreda)
Begi, Oromia (woreda)
Begi, Ethiopia, a town